Otis Ruel "Pete" Redinger (December 31, 1896 – September 26, 1969) was an American football player who played professionally for one season in the National Football League {NFL) with the Canton Bulldogs, during the 1925 season. Redinger played college football at Pennsylvania State University and Colgate University.

References

1896 births
1969 deaths
American football halfbacks
Canton Bulldogs players
Colgate Raiders football players
Penn State Nittany Lions football players
People from Washington, Pennsylvania
Players of American football from Pennsylvania